The Ihle is a river of Saxony-Anhalt, Germany. A former tributary of the Elbe, it discharges into the Elbe–Havel Canal (and its predecessor Ihlekanal) since the 1860s.

See also
List of rivers of Saxony-Anhalt

Rivers of Saxony-Anhalt
Rivers of Germany